Farranfore is a village in County Kerry, Ireland. It lies on the N22 road approximately midway between Tralee (10 miles or 17 km) and Killarney (9 miles or 15 km) and on the railway line connecting the two towns.

Farranfore came into existence as a turnpike; a gate at the cross-roads in the village marked the boundary of the lands of the Earls of Kenmare.

Transport
Between 1893 and 1960, Farranfore railway station, which opened on 18 July 1859, was known as Farranfore Junction, as it was the point where one boarded for the spectacular train ride to Valentia Harbour, which was the westernmost railway in Europe.

Farranfore is notable in particular for its nearby airport, known as Kerry Airport. The single runway at Farranfore saw intensive use when Ryanair opened a base at the airport in July 2008. Ryanair flies daily from Farranfore to London Stansted, London Luton and Frankfurt-Hahn. In the wake of its disagreements with Cork Airport, it announced that it was moving its Liverpool service from Cork to Farranfore from June 2006 (this service subsequently ended later that year). Aer Lingus Regional also flies daily from Farranfore airport to Dublin Airport.

Notable people
 Jack Sherwood, footballer
 Donal Daly, footballer

See also
 List of towns and villages in Ireland.

References

External links
Farranfore railway station
Kerry Airport

Towns and villages in County Kerry